Suruí may refer to:

The Suruí, or Paiter, an indigenous people of Rondônia, Brazil
Surui language, language of the Paiter people
Suruí do Pará people, an indigenous people of Pará, Brazil
Suruí do Pará language
Suruí River, a river in Rio de Janeiro state in southeastern Brazil
BYD Surui, a premium trim level of the BYD F3 compact sedan